Asphalt is a series of racing video games developed and published by Gameloft. Games in the series typically focus on fast-paced arcade racing set in various locales throughout the world, tasking players to complete races while evading the local law enforcement in police pursuits.

Asphalt Urban GT, the first game in the series, was released for the Nintendo DS and N-Gage in 2004 alongside simplified J2ME versions for mobile phones. Incarnations of the game for various other platforms soon followed, the latest in the main series being Asphalt 9: Legends released in 2018; a number of spinoffs were also released, such as the endless runner Asphalt Overdrive, Asphalt Nitro, a minimal version of Asphalt for low-end devices with procedural generation as a selling point, Asphalt Xtreme, an off-road-centric entry into the series, and the drag racing game Asphalt Street Storm.

Common elements
The series puts emphasis on fast-paced, arcade-style street racing in the vein of Need for Speed, along with elements from other racing games such as Burnout; the spin-off game Asphalt Xtreme takes place in an off-road racing setting, with open-wheel buggies, sport-utility vehicles and rally cars in lieu of supercars as in previous games. Each game in the series puts players behind the wheel of licensed sports cars from various manufacturers, from entry-level models such as the Dodge Dart GT, to supercars like the Bugatti Veyron, and even concept cars such as Mercedes-Benz's Biome design study.

Police chases are a recurring gameplay element especially in the early games, but were de-emphasized in favour of stunt jumps and aerobatic maneuvers as of Airborne; they made a return, however, with Overdrive and Nitro, the latter of which combined elements from Airborne and previous games in the series.

Over the course of the games, players are gradually given access to various race courses, most of which are modelled after real-world locations and major cities, and upgrades for vehicles which can be bought from money earned in a race, or in later games, points or through in-application purchases using real currency. Events are presented in increasing difficulty as players advance through the game, sometimes requiring them to complete bonus challenges, e.g. taking down a given number of opponent racers or finishing the race without wrecking their vehicle.

History
The first mainline game in the series is Asphalt Urban GT, which was released for the Nintendo DS and N-Gage on November 21, 2004, with simplified versions for J2ME mobile phones being released on December 2. A video on Gameloft's YouTube channel however lists their mobile phone adaptation of Speed Devils as the first game in the series.

Asphalt 4: Elite Racing was the first game in the series to be released for iOS. Asphalt 6: Adrenaline marks the first game in the series to be released for macOS; later home computer releases in the series are exclusive to Microsoft Windows, with Asphalt 7: Heat being the first to be released on the Windows Store.

Asphalt 8: Airborne, the eighth main installment and tenth title overall, was released in 2013 for iOS, Android, Windows and Blackberry platforms to critical acclaim, becoming one of the bestselling games on the iOS App Store and Google Play Store. Asphalt Nitro, the twelfth title in the series, was quietly released on Gameloft's own app store in May 2015 for Android, alongside a 2.5D J2ME version of the game for feature phones. A main selling point of Nitro was the game's small resource footprint, which was aided by the use of procedural generation.

A free-to-play spinoff entitled Asphalt Overdrive was released for iOS and Android in September 2014. Unlike prior titles in the series, the game is presented as an "endless runner" similar to the Temple Run franchise and Subway Surfers, and does not offer a traditional racing mode. Overdrive was then followed by Asphalt Xtreme, which focuses on arcade-style off-road racing, and in 2016 with Asphalt: Street Storm, a rhythm-based drag racing game in the vein of NaturalMotion's CSR Racing. Street Storm was quietly released in the Philippines in December 2016 for iOS devices. Asphalt 9: Legends was released worldwide in July 2018, for macOS in January 2020, and for Xbox One and Xbox Series X/S on August 31, 2021.

Games
Asphalt: Urban GT (N-Gage, NDS, J2ME, BREW, DoJa)
Asphalt: Urban GT 2 (N-Gage, NDS, Symbian, PSP, J2ME)
Asphalt: Import Tuner Edition (J2ME, BREW)
Asphalt 3: Street Rules (N-Gage, Symbian, Windows Mobile, J2ME)
Asphalt 4: Elite Racing (N-Gage, iOS, DSiWare, Symbian OS, Windows Mobile, J2ME, BlackBerry OS)
Asphalt Online (DoJa, BREW)
Asphalt 5 (iOS, Android, Symbian, Windows Phone 7,  Bada, webOS, Freebox)
Asphalt 6: Adrenaline (iOS, OS X, Android, Symbian, J2ME, BlackBerry Tablet OS, Bada, webOS, Freebox)
Asphalt Audi RS 3 (iOS)
Asphalt 3D (3DS)
Asphalt: Injection (PS Vita, Android)
Asphalt 7: Heat (iOS, Android, Windows Phone 8, Windows 8, Windows 10, BlackBerry 10, BlackBerry Tablet OS)
Asphalt 8: Airborne (iOS, Android, Windows Phone 8, Windows RT, Windows 8, BlackBerry 10, Windows 10, Windows 10 Mobile, tvOS, macOS, Tizen)
Asphalt Overdrive (iOS, Android, Windows Phone 8, Windows 8, Windows 10, Windows 10 Mobile)
Asphalt Nitro (Android, Java ME, Tizen)
Asphalt Xtreme (iOS, Android, Windows 8, Windows Phone 8, Windows 10, Windows 10 Mobile)
Asphalt Street Storm (iOS, Android, Windows 8, Windows 10)
Asphalt 9: Legends (iOS, Android, Windows 10, Nintendo Switch, macOS, Xbox One, Xbox Series X/S)
Asphalt Retro (Browser)
Asphalt Nitro 2 (Android)

References

External links

 
Gameloft games
Vivendi franchises
Racing video games
Video game franchises introduced in 2004